Jenean Michelle Hampton (born May 12, 1958) is an American politician who served as the 57th lieutenant governor of Kentucky from 2015 to 2019. Hampton was the running mate of gubernatorial candidate Matt Bevin in the 2015 election. A Republican, Hampton was the first African American to hold statewide office in Kentucky history and the third African-American woman to have served as lieutenant governor of a U.S. state.

Early life and education
Jenean Michelle Hampton was born on May 12, 1958 and raised in Detroit, Michigan, one of four daughters born to Donald and Marie Hampton. Her parents divorced when she was seven years old, leaving her mother to raise Hampton and her sisters on her own. Hampton's mother struggled because she lacked a high school diploma. After Hampton graduated from high school, she worked for five years in the automotive industry in order to help pay for her college education. She earned an Industrial Engineering degree from Wayne State University in 1985. She later earned a Master of Business Administration degree from the University of Rochester.

Military and business career

Hampton served in the United States Air Force for seven years as a computer systems officer, eventually attaining the rank of Captain. During Operation Desert Storm, she was deployed to Saudi Arabia. While stationed in Saudi Arabia, Hampton was responsible for radar software used in tracking enemy planes and in search and rescue missions.

Hampton spent 19 years working in the corrugated packaging industry, eventually reaching the position of plant manager.

Political career
A Republican, Hampton first sought political office in 2014. That year, she unsuccessfully challenged State Representative Jody Richards. Hampton has been active in her local party and in the Tea Party Movement.

Hampton was selected by Matt Bevin as his running mate for Governor of Kentucky in 2015. On November 3, 2015, Bevin and Hampton defeated the Democratic ticket of Attorney General Jack Conway and State Representative Sannie Overly in the 2015 Kentucky gubernatorial election. Bevin and Hampton were sworn in to their respective posts on December 8, 2015. Hampton was the first African American to hold statewide office in Kentucky history and the third black woman to serve as lieutenant governor of a U.S. state. She was the 57th Lieutenant Governor of Kentucky.

Bevin did not select Hampton as his running mate in his 2019 re-election bid. Her term expired in December 2019. After Bevin lost the general election, Hampton stated that she had voted for Libertarian nominee John Hicks instead of Bevin.

Personal life
Hampton lives in Bowling Green, Kentucky. She is married to Colonel Dr. Doyle Isaak, a retired U.S. Air Force officer.

She is a licensed amateur radio operator.

Hampton is also a member of the Civil Air Patrol, holding the grade of lieutenant colonel.

See also
 List of African-American Republicans
 List of female lieutenant governors in the United States
 List of minority governors and lieutenant governors in the United States

References

External links
 

|-

1958 births
21st-century American politicians
21st-century American women politicians
African-American female military personnel
African-American people in Kentucky politics
African-American women in politics
Amateur radio people
Amateur radio women
Baptists from Kentucky
Baptists from Michigan
Female officers of the United States Air Force
Kentucky Republicans
Lieutenant Governors of Kentucky
Living people
Military personnel from Detroit
People of the Civil Air Patrol
Politicians from Bowling Green, Kentucky
Politicians from Detroit
Tea Party movement activists
United States Air Force officers
University of Rochester alumni
Wayne State University alumni
Women in Kentucky politics
21st-century African-American women
21st-century African-American politicians
20th-century African-American people
20th-century African-American women
African-American United States Air Force personnel
Black conservatism in the United States